Formosa International Airport , also known as El Pucú Airport, is an international airport serving Formosa, Argentina, a city on the Paraguay River, which is locally the border between Argentina and Paraguay. The airport is operated by Aeropuertos Argentina 2000.

Airlines and destinations

See also

Transport in Argentina
List of airports in Argentina

References

External links 
Formosa Airport, Organismo Regulador del Sistema Nacional de Aeropuertos

Airports in Argentina
Buildings and structures in Formosa, Argentina